Keith Robert Strohmaier Poole (born June 18, 1974 in San Jose, California) is a former professional American football wide receiver in the National Football League (NFL) for the New Orleans Saints and Denver Broncos from 1997 to 2001.  Poole was a stand out receiver at Clovis High School in Clovis, California and played collegiately at Arizona State alongside quarterback Jake Plummer. In 1996, he and Plummer helped lead the Sun Devils to the Rose Bowl only to lose to Ohio State 20-17.

Poole was selected by the Saints in the fourth round of the 1997 NFL Draft. In his five-year NFL career, Poole caught 96 receptions for 1,734 yards and 11 touchdowns.

In 1998, he pleaded guilty to misdemeanor battery for attacking a man with a golf club, and was sentenced to two years of probation. He was fined $4,500, according to the Saints and NFL.

References

1974 births
Living people
Sportspeople from Clovis, California
American football wide receivers
Arizona State Sun Devils football players
New Orleans Saints players
Denver Broncos players
Players of American football from San Jose, California